When Ludwig Goes on Manoeuvres (German: Wenn Ludwig ins Manöver zieht)  is a 1967 West German historical comedy film directed by Werner Jacobs, starring Hansi Kraus as Ludwig Thoma, Heidelinde Weis and Rudolf Rhomberg. The script was provided by producer Franz Seitz who chose his pen name "Georg Laforet" for the credits. Besides many well-known actors of the day, the film also features Zlatko Čajkovski, 1967's trainer of FC Bayern Munich, his goal-getter Gerd Müller and his goalkeeper Sepp Maier.

The film's sets were designed by the art directors Wolf Englert and Bruno Monden. It was shot in Eastmancolor.

Plot
The Prussian Army comes to Bavaria for a military exercise. They show off and try to demonstrate superiority. Yet they don't stand a chance because they are not prepared to tackle Ludwig's nifty pranks.

Cast
Hansi Kraus as Ludwig Thoma
Heidelinde Weis as Cora Reiser
Elisabeth Flickenschildt as Aunt Frieda
Rudolf Rhomberg as Pfarrer "Kindlein" Falkenberg / Feldwebel Falkenberg 
Hubert von Meyerinck as Oberst von Below
Hans Terofal as Bader Gschwind
Georg Thomalla as Hauptmann Stumpf
Karl Schönböck as Corpsgeneral
Hans Quest as Rittmeister von Stülphagel
Dieter Borsche as Wilhelm II
Beppo Brem as Rafenauer 
Friedrich von Thun as Franz Reiser
Claus Wilcke as Oberleutnant von Busch
Evelyn Gressmann as princess
Veronika Fitz as waitress Fanny
Sepp Rist as Oberst von der Tann
Zlatko Čajkovski as company's cook Čajkovski
Sepp Maier as Sepp Maier
Gerd Müller as Müller

References

External links

West German films
Films directed by Werner Jacobs
Films set in the 1880s
Films set in Bavaria
Military humor in film
Cultural depictions of Wilhelm II
1960s historical comedy films
German historical comedy films
Constantin Film films
1960s German-language films
1960s German films